The 2022–23 Magnolia Hotshots season is the 34th season of the franchise in the Philippine Basketball Association (PBA).

Key dates
May 15: The PBA Season 47 draft was held at the Robinsons Place Manila in Manila.

Draft picks

Roster

Philippine Cup

Eliminations

Standings

Game log

|-bgcolor=ffcccc
| 1
| June 5
| TNT
| L 72–78
| Ian Sangalang (18)
| Calvin Abueva (12)
| Jio Jalalon (3)
| Smart Araneta Coliseum8,241
| 0–1
|-bgcolor=ffcccc
| 2
| June 10
| Converge
| L 82–89 (OT)
| Ian Sangalang (22)
| Calvin Abueva (13)
| Jio Jalalon (9)
| Ynares Center
| 0–2
|-bgcolor=ccffcc
| 3
| June 15
| NorthPort
| W 80–77
| Calvin Abueva (23)
| Calvin Abueva (12)
| Jio Jalalon (6)
| SM Mall of Asia Arena
| 1–2
|-bgcolor=ffcccc
| 4
| June 17
| San Miguel
| L 81–87
| Mark Barroca (25)
| Barroca, Laput (8)
| Mark Barroca (7)
| Ynares Center
| 1–3
|-bgcolor=ccffcc
| 5
| June 19
| Barangay Ginebra
| W 89–84
| Ian Sangalang (24)
| Ian Sangalang (9)
| Mark Barroca (8)
| SM Mall of Asia Arena
| 2–3
|-bgcolor=ccffcc
| 6
| June 24
| Phoenix
| W 95–77
| Mark Barroca (21)
| Ian Sangalang (10)
| Jio Jalalon (8)
| SM Mall of Asia Arena
| 3–3

|-bgcolor=ccffcc
| 7
| July 2
| NLEX
| W 87–73
| Mark Barroca (18)
| Ian Sangalang (9)
| Jio Jalalon (9)
| Smart Araneta Coliseum
| 4–3
|-bgcolor=ccffcc
| 8
| July 8
| Terrafirma
| W 104–83
| Ian Sangalang (20)
| Laput, Sangalang (7)
| Jio Jalalon (7)
| Smart Araneta Coliseum
| 5–3
|-bgcolor=ccffcc
| 9
| July 15
| Meralco
| W 97–88 (OT)
| Paul Lee (21)
| Ian Sangalang (15)
| Jio Jalalon (8)
| Ynares Center
| 6–3
|-bgcolor=ccffcc
| 10
| July 20
| Rain or Shine
| W 118–87
| Jerrick Ahanmisi (19)
| Jio Jalalon (11)
| Jio Jalalon (12)
| Smart Araneta Coliseum
| 7–3
|-bgcolor=ccffcc
| 11
| July 22
| Blackwater
| W 75–66
| Paul Lee (22)
| Calvin Abueva (10)
| Mark Barroca (6)
| Smart Araneta Coliseum
| 8–3

Playoffs

Bracket

Game log

|-bgcolor=ccffcc
| 1
| July 24
| NLEX
| W 98–89
| Mark Barroca (24)
| Calvin Abueva (8)
| Jalalon, Lee (5)
| Smart Araneta Coliseum
| 1–0
|-bgcolor=ffcccc
| 2
| July 29
| NLEX
| L 77–90
| Calvin Abueva (20)
| Calvin Abueva (7)
| Barroca, Jalalon (5)
| Filoil EcoOil Centre
| 1–1
|-bgcolor=ccffcc
| 3
| July 31
| NLEX
| W 112–106 (OT)
| Ian Sangalang (24)
| Ian Sangalang (11)
| Abueva, Jalalon (6)
| SM Mall of Asia Arena
| 2–1

|-bgcolor=ffcccc
| 1
| August 3
| TNT
| L 96–108
| Calvin Abueva (18)
| Aris Dionisio (13)
| Jio Jalalon (8)
| Smart Araneta Coliseum
| 0–1
|-bgcolor=ccffcc
| 2
| August 5
| TNT
| W 92–88
| Mark Barroca (22)
| Abueva, Sangalang (8)
| Calvin Abueva (5)
| Smart Araneta Coliseum
| 1–1
|-bgcolor=ffcccc
| 3
| August 7
| TNT
| L 92–93
| Calvin Abueva (18)
| Ian Sangalang (9)
| Jio Jalalon (7)
| Smart Araneta Coliseum
| 1–2
|-bgcolor=ffcccc
| 4
| August 10
| TNT
| L 84–102
| Ian Sangalang (19)
| Dela Rosa, Dionisio, Jalalon (6)
| Calvin Abueva (6)
| Smart Araneta Coliseum
| 1–3
|-bgcolor=ccffcc
| 5
| August 12
| TNT
| W 105–97
| Mark Barroca (25)
| Calvin Abueva (10)
| Calvin Abueva (5)
| Smart Araneta Coliseum
| 2–3
|-bgcolor=ffcccc
| 6
| August 14
| TNT
| L 74–87
| Abueva, Sangalang (16)
| Ian Sangalang (12)
| Mark Barroca (9)
| Smart Araneta Coliseum9,439
| 2–4

Commissioner's Cup

Eliminations

Standings

Game log

|-bgcolor=ccffcc
| 1
| September 28, 2022
| Terrafirma
| W 100–92
| Nick Rakocevic (45)
| Nick Rakocevic (25)
| Mark Barroca (8)
| SM Mall of Asia Arena
| 1–0

|-bgcolor=ccffcc
| 2
| October 1, 2022
| Converge
| W 109–105
| Nick Rakocevic (21)
| Nick Rakocevic (24)
| Jio Jalalon (6)
| Smart Araneta Coliseum
| 2–0
|-bgcolor=ccffcc
| 3
| October 5, 2022
| TNT
| W 94–92
| Calvin Abueva (25)
| Nick Rakocevic (15)
| Mark Barroca (5)
| Smart Araneta Coliseum
| 3–0
|-bgcolor=ccffcc
| 4
| October 12, 2022
| NLEX
| W 111–97
| Nick Rakocevic (36)
| Nick Rakocevic (15)
| Jio Jalalon (8)
| Smart Araneta Coliseum
| 4–0
|-bgcolor=ccffcc
| 5
| October 16, 2022
| NorthPort
| W 109–91
| Nick Rakocevic (26)
| Nick Rakocevic (14)
| Mark Barroca (8)
| Smart Araneta Coliseum
| 5–0
|-bgcolor=ffcccc
| 6
| October 23, 2022
| Barangay Ginebra
| L 97–103
| Paul Lee (22)
| Nick Rakocevic (17)
| Nick Rakocevic (6)
| SM Mall of Asia Arena12,087
| 5–1

|-bgcolor=ccffcc
| 7
| November 6, 2022
| Blackwater
| W 91–69
| Rakocevic, Sangalang (17)
| Nick Rakocevic (15)
| Jio Jalalon (9)
| Smart Araneta Coliseum10,149
| 6–1
|-bgcolor=ccffcc
| 8
| November 12, 2022
| Phoenix
| W 90–80
| Nick Rakocevic (18)
| Nick Rakocevic (18)
| Jio Jalalon (9)
| Ynares Center
| 7–1
|-bgcolor=ccffcc
| 9
| November 16, 2022
| San Miguel
| W 85–80
| Nick Rakocevic (26)
| Nick Rakocevic (28)
| Mark Barroca (4)
| Smart Araneta Coliseum
| 8–1
|-bgcolor=ffcccc
| 10
| November 19, 2022
| Bay Area
| L 89–95
| Nick Rakocevic (26)
| Nick Rakocevic (19)
| Mark Barroca (8)
| PhilSports Arena
| 8–2
|-bgcolor=ccffcc
| 11
| November 27, 2022
| Meralco
| W 108–96
| Paul Lee (27)
| Nick Rakocevic (20)
| Mark Barroca (6)
| PhilSports Arena
| 9–2

|-bgcolor=ccffcc
| 12
| December 2, 2022
| Rain or Shine
| W 106–90
| Nick Rakocevic (21)
| Nick Rakocevic (13)
| Jio Jalalon (12)
| PhilSports Arena
| 10–2

Playoffs

Bracket

Game log

|-bgcolor=ccffcc
| 1
| December 9, 2022
| Phoenix
| W 102–95
| Calvin Abueva (19)
| Nick Rakocevic (13)
| Mark Barroca (5)
| PhilSports Arena
| 1–0

|-bgcolor=ffcccc
| 1
| December 14, 2022
| Barangay Ginebra
| L 84–87
| Paul Lee (21)
| Calvin Abueva (12)
| Mark Barroca (9)
| PhilSports Arena
| 0–1
|-bgcolor=ccffcc
| 2
| December 16, 2022
| Barangay Ginebra
| W 96–95
| Paul Lee (24)
| Nick Rakocevic (20)
| Jio Jalalon (5)
| PhilSports Arena
| 1–1
|-bgcolor=ffcccc
| 3
| December 18, 2022
| Barangay Ginebra
| L 80–103
| Jio Jalalon (16)
| Nick Rakocevic (12)
| Barroca, Jalalon (6)
| PhilSports Arena
| 1–2
|-bgcolor=ffcccc
| 4
| December 21, 2022
| Barangay Ginebra
| L 84–99 
| Calvin Abueva (14)
| Nick Rakocevic (13)
| Jio Jalalon (9)
| SM Mall of Asia Arena
| 1–3

Governors' Cup

Eliminations

Standings

Game log

|-bgcolor=ffcccc
| 1
| January 29
| Converge
| L 109–111
| Erik McCree (38)
| Erik McCree (16)
| Jio Jalalon (5)
| Ynares Center
| 0–1

|-bgcolor=ffcccc
| 2
| February 3
| TNT
| L 85–93
| Paul Lee (24)
| Erik McCree (16) 
| Calvin Abueva (5)
| Ynares Center
| 0–2
|-bgcolor=ffcccc
| 3
| February 5
| San Miguel
| L 98–100
| Paul Lee (19)
| Erik McCree (8) 
| Mark Barroca (7)
| Smart Araneta Coliseum10,080
| 0–3
|-bgcolor=ccffcc
| 4
| February 10
| Phoenix
| W 108–95 
| Antonio Hester (28)
| Antonio Hester (12)
| Hester, Jalalon (6)
| SM Mall of Asia Arena
| 1–3
|-bgcolor=ccffcc
| 5
| February 12
| Barangay Ginebra
| W 118–88
| Antonio Hester (28)
| Antonio Hester (18)
| Antonio Hester (9)
| SM Mall of Asia Arena11,212
| 2–3
|-bgcolor=ccffcc
| 6
| February 16
| NLEX
| W 119–103
| Antonio Hester (37)
| Antonio Hester (15)
| Jio Jalalon (12)
| Smart Araneta Coliseum
| 3–3
|-bgcolor=ccffcc
| 7
| February 22
| Rain or Shine
| W 112–97 
| Barroca, Jalalon, Lee (19)
| Antonio Hester (15)
| Hester, Lee (5)
| PhilSports Arena
| 4–3
|-bgcolor=ffcccc
| 8
| February 26
| Meralco
| L 84–86
| Antonio Hester (23)
| Antonio Hester (15)
| Abueva, Lee (5)
| Smart Araneta Coliseum
| 4–4

|-bgcolor=ccffcc
| 9
| March 2
| NorthPort
| W 129–109
| Antonio Hester (28)
| Antonio Hester (14)
| Mark Barroca (8)
| Smart Araneta Coliseum
| 5–4
|-bgcolor=ccffcc
| 10
| March 4
| Terrafirma
| W 121–115 (OT)
| Antonio Hester (40)
| Abueva, Hester (17)
| Jio Jalalon (9)
| PhilSports Arena
| 6–4
|-bgcolor=ccffcc
| 11
| March 8
| Blackwater
| W 110–95
| Calvin Abueva (27)
| Antonio Hester (20)
| Jio Jalalon (11)
| Ynares Center
| 7–4

Playoffs

Bracket

Transactions

Free agency

Signings

Recruited imports

References

Magnolia Hotshots seasons
Magnolia Hotshots